Little Indian Run may refer to:

Little Indian Run (Little Muncy Creek), in Pennsylvania
Little Indian Run (West Virginia)